Alexis Yetna (born 9 October 1998) is a French college basketball player for the Seton Hall Pirates of the Big East Conference. He previously played for the South Florida Bulls.

Early life and career
Yetna grew up in Vauréal, France and played association football for eight years. In 2012, he started playing basketball for Vauréal Basket Club, one year before joining Cergy-Pontoise Basketball. Yetna moved to the United States with the help of coach Xavier Calvaire to compete for Mt. Zion Preparatory School in Baltimore, Maryland. After one year, he transferred to Putnam Science Academy in Putnam, Connecticut, where he played alongside future NBA player Hamidou Diallo. On 19 April 2017, he committed to play college basketball for South Florida over offers from Old Dominion, Oregon State and St. John's, among others. He had been discovered by South Florida's assistant coach Tom Herrion.

College career
Yetna was ruled ineligible for his first season at South Florida by the National Collegiate Athletic Association because he had played prep basketball two years after graduating from high school in France. On 15 December 2018, Yetna recorded 13 points and a freshman season-high 18 rebounds in a 76–69 win over Appalachian State. On 26 January 2019, he posted a season-high 28 points and 13 rebounds in a 77–57 victory over East Carolina. Yetna sustained a hamstring injury against Memphis in February 2019. Yetna was a four-time American Athletic Conference (AAC) Freshman of the Week and was named AAC Freshman of the Year. As a freshman, he averaged 12.3 points and 9.6 rebounds per game, leading the AAC in rebounding and double-doubles (15). He grabbed 346 rebounds, the most by a freshman in school and AAC history. Yetna missed his entire next season after suffering a left knee injury in practice. He underwent surgery for the injury. As a junior, he averaged 9.5 points and 7.3 rebounds per game, missing six games with an ankle injury. After the season, Yetna transferred to Seton Hall, choosing the Pirates over UConn.

National team career
Yetna played for France at the 2017 FIBA U20 European Championship in Greece. He averaged three points and 3.6 rebounds per game, helping his team win the bronze medal.

Career statistics

College

|-
| style="text-align:left;"| 2017–18
| style="text-align:left;"| South Florida
| style="text-align:center;" colspan="11"|  Redshirt
|-
| style="text-align:left;"| 2018–19
| style="text-align:left;"| South Florida
| 36 || 34 || 30.2 || .539 || .368 || .625 || 9.6 || 1.0 || .8 || .6 || 12.3
|-
| style="text-align:left;"| 2019–20
| style="text-align:left;"| South Florida
| style="text-align:center;" colspan="11"|  Injured
|-
| style="text-align:left;"| 2020–21
| style="text-align:left;"| South Florida
| 16 || 15 || 27.3 || .463 || .315 || .719 || 7.3 || .8 || .4 || .6 || 9.5
|-
| style="text-align:left;"| 2021–22
| style="text-align:left;"| Seton Hall
| 31 || 17 || 23.9 || .404 || .228 || .750 || 7.6 || .8 || .6 || .3 || 8.1
|- class="sortbottom"
| style="text-align:center;" colspan="2"| Career
| 83 || 66 || 27.3 || .479 || .301 || .676 || 8.4 || .9 || .7 || .5 || 10.2

Personal life
Yetna is the son of Gisele Abossolo and Jean Didier Yetna. He is of Cameroonian descent.

References

External links
Seton Hall Pirates bio
South Florida Bulls bio

1998 births
Living people
French men's basketball players
People from Saint-Quentin, Aisne
Power forwards (basketball)
French expatriate basketball people in the United States
South Florida Bulls men's basketball players
French sportspeople of Cameroonian descent
Black French sportspeople
Sportspeople from Aisne
Sportspeople from Val-d'Oise